is a railway station in Arakawa, Tokyo, Japan, operated jointly by East Japan Railway Company (JR East) and the two Tokyo subway operators Tokyo Metro and Toei.

Lines
Nishi-Nippori Station is served by the following lines.
Yamanote Line
Keihin-Tōhoku Line
Tokyo Metro Chiyoda Line
Nippori-Toneri Liner

Platforms

JR East

Tokyo Metro

Toei 
The Nippori-Toneri Liner station is elevated and consists of a single island platform serving two tracks.

History
The Chiyoda Line station opened on 20 December 1969. The Yamanote Line station opened on 20 April 1971. The Nippori-Toneri Liner station opened on 30 March 2008.

The station facilities of the Chiyoda Line were inherited by Tokyo Metro after the privatization of the Teito Rapid Transit Authority (TRTA) in 2004.

Station numbering was introduced in 2016 with Nishi-Nippori being assigned station numbers JY08 for the Yamanote line and JK33 for the Keihin-Tōhoku line. Numbering was expanded to the Nippori-Toneri Liner platforms in November 2017 with the station receiving station number NT02.

Passenger statistics
In fiscal 2013, the JR East station was used by an average of 97,268 passengers daily (boarding passengers only), making it the 41st-busiest station operated by JR East. In fiscal 2013, the Tokyo Metro station was used by an average of 162,852 passengers per day (exiting and entering passengers), making it the fifteenth-busiest station operated by Tokyo Metro. Over the same fiscal year, the Toei station was used by an average of 10,500 per day (boarding passengers only), making it the second-busiest station on the Nippori-Toneri Liner. The daily average passenger figures for JR East and Tokyo Metro in previous years are as shown below.

 Note that JR East figures are for boarding passengers only.

Surrounding area
 Ogubashi-dōri Street
 Dōkanyama-dōri Avenue
 Kaisei Junior & Senior High School

See also

 List of railway stations in Japan

References

External links

 Nishi-Nippori Station (JR East) 
 Nishi-Nippori Station (Tokyo Metro) 
 Nishi-Nippori Station (Toei) 

Railway stations in Japan opened in 1969
Yamanote Line
Keihin-Tōhoku Line
Tokyo Metro Chiyoda Line
Stations of East Japan Railway Company
Stations of Tokyo Metro
Nippori-Toneri Liner